A little Child will lead them (from Isaiah 11:6) may refer to

 "A child will lead them", biblically inspired heraldry
 And a Little Child Shall Lead Them, an American silent short drama film
 "And the Children Shall Lead", a 1968 episode of the American science fiction television series, Star Trek

See also
 Lamb and lion (disambiguation)
 Peaceable Kingdom
 Children's Crusade